Wong Man-wai (born 10 March 1943) is a Taiwanese former footballer. He competed in the men's tournament at the 1960 Summer Olympics.

References

External links
 
 

1943 births
Living people
Taiwanese footballers
Chinese Taipei international footballers from Hong Kong
Olympic footballers of Taiwan
Footballers at the 1960 Summer Olympics
1968 AFC Asian Cup players
Association football midfielders
Happy Valley AA players